Abdulnasser El-Oulabi (born 2 September 1959) is a Syrian former wrestler who competed in the 1980 Summer Olympics.

References

1959 births
Living people
Olympic wrestlers of Syria
Wrestlers at the 1980 Summer Olympics
Syrian male sport wrestlers